The sixteenth season of Australian reality television series The Block premiered on 23 August 2020 on the Nine Network. Hosts Scott Cam and Shelley Craft, site foremen Keith Schleiger and Dan Reilly, and judges Neale Whitaker, Shaynna Blaze and Darren Palmer, all returned from the previous season.

Production
In July 2019, it was reported by the Herald Sun that The Block and Channel 9 had acquired a vacant block of land in the exclusive bayside suburb of Brighton on 360 New Street, Brighton. Newly renovated houses are expected to be built on the land in 2020 for the 16th season of the Block.

Applications for the sixteenth season of the series opened in August 2019 until 15 September 2019, looking for couples aged between 18 and 65 years old being sought by casting agents. Filming for the season is slated to begin in late January 2020.

In October 2019, the sixteenth season and location of The Block were officially confirmed at Nine's upfronts.

In March 2020, the season was suspended due to the COVID-19 pandemic in Australia and the potential risk it could cause to the crew, workers and contestants. After more than a month of suspension, the season resumed production on 4 May 2020 with extra safety precautions set in place.

Due to the health and safety standards caused by COVID-19, The Block’s open for inspection will be a virtual experience which took place on 9Now on Monday, 16 November 2020. The Block auctions (or Block-tions) for the houses were held on Saturday, 21 November 2020, with the final episode of 2020 airing the next day on Channel Nine and 9Now at 7:00pm (AEDT) on Sunday, 22 November 2020.

Jimmy and Tam won the series with their house selling for over $4.2m. All houses sold on auction day with all teams profiting well over $400k.

Contestants
This is the eighth season of The Block to have five couples instead of the traditional four couples.

Score history

Weekly Room Budget

Weekly Room Prize

Results

Judges' Scores
 Colour key:
  Highest Score
  Lowest Score

Challenge scores

Auction

Ratings

Notes
Ratings data is from OzTAM and represents the live and same day average viewership from the 5 largest Australian metropolitan centres (Sydney, Melbourne, Brisbane, Perth and Adelaide).
 Throughout the course of the series, the teams total room score will be accumulated to decide which team will choose the auction order for all other teams.
The original score of Jimmy & Tam's Master Ensuite was 28, but they used a bonus point they won in the “Block It In Challenge”. Their score was changed to 29.
The original score of Daniel & Jade's Kitchen was 28½, but they used a bonus point they won in the “Pottery Challenge”. Their score was changed to 29½.
These are the rooms each teams has built Upstairs: 
Sarah & George: Study, Powder Room & Bedroom
Luke & Jasmin: Living Room & Bedroom
Daniel & Jade: Bedroom, Living Room & Study 
Harry & Tash: Bedroom & Study
Jimmy & Tam: Media Room & Bedroom
The original score of Jimmy & Tam's Stairway, Hallway & Laundry was 28, but they used a bonus point they won in the “LEGO Dream House Challenge”. Their score was changed to 29.
 The buyer of the house at the auction failed to pay for the property for $4,256,000. Which made Jimmy and Tam win the series. This failure to pay for the property caused a void in the contract making the property go back on the market. However Jimmy and Tam were allowed to keep the prize of $100,000, as well as the money over reserve.

References

2020 Australian television seasons
Television productions suspended due to the COVID-19 pandemic
16